Pastor Birger L. D. Brekke (3 May 1891 – 15 April 1981) was a Norwegian Scout leader, and served as the Chief Scout of the Norsk Speidergutt-Forbund from 1945 to 1956.

Brekke was the 20th recipient of the Silver Wolf, Norway's highest Scout award, in 1949.

References

1891 births
1981 deaths
Norwegian priests
Scouting and Guiding in Norway
Chief Scouts